Colinus is a genus of birds in the New World quail family, Odontophoridae. Members of the genus are commonly known as bobwhites.

Species

Extant species

Fossil species
 †Colinus eatoni 
 †Colinus suilium Brodkorb 1959
 †Colinus hibbardi Wetmore 1944

References

External links
 
 

 
Bird genera
 
Taxa named by Georg August Goldfuss
Taxonomy articles created by Polbot